HC Kunlun Red Star is a Chinese ice hockey club that joined the Kontinental Hockey League (KHL) prior to the 2016–17 season.

History

Preparation of the team
In March 2016, representatives of Kunlun Red Star and the KHL signed a protocol of intent to have a Chinese-based team enter the KHL. The protocol was signed by the representative from the Russian Ice Hockey Federation Vladislav Tretiak, the chairman of the KHL Gennady Timchenko and the board of Kunlun Red Star. In mid-April, the president of IIHF, René Fasel, shared his opinion about the intention of the Chinese club to join the KHL, expressing hope that this would help China bring their hockey to a higher level.

The club was required to meet contractual economic conditions by 30 April 2016 in order to join the KHL. According to Roman Rotenberg, HC Kunlun Red Star applied to fulfill its obligations, but there was a coherent number of formalities for the final decision about team to be taken by June 2016. In early May, the KHL president Dmitry Chernyshenko considered the affiliation of the club to the league as an already done deal: "The club has provided all the documents on the scene, the structure of the club, finance, and they have the permission of the Chinese Ice Hockey Association, the Standing Committee of the National People's Congress and the State Council of the People's Republic of China."

It was announced on 25 June 2016 that the KHL board of directors had officially accepted the club's application and that they would be participating in the upcoming 2016–17 KHL season. The Beijing announcement ceremony included Russian President Vladimir Putin and his Chinese counterpart Xi Jinping.

Home games were to be played at the LeSports Center in Beijing and at the Sports Center Pavilion in Shanghai. In November 2016, it was reported the team was playing its games at the Feiyang Skating Center in Shanghai as the Beijing facility was booked full with concerts and basketball games, though plans were to return to Beijing in December. All players are required to salute during the pre-game playing of the "March of the Volunteers", the national anthem of the People's Republic of China. Many Chinese players are officers in the People's Liberation Army.

There were early rumours that Ilya Kovalchuk would join the team as a player, and that Mike Keenan would be the first head coach but both proved false, as Kovalchuk remained with SKA Saint Petersburg, and Vladimir Yurzinov Jr. was named the first head coach of Kunlun. Keenan would later coach Kunlun Red Star from March to December 2017.

2016–17 season

On 24 July 2016, the team played its first pre-season game, in which it was defeated 2–0 by Traktor Chelyabinsk.

In a later exhibition match, on 8 August 2016 against Barys Astana, a fight broke out minutes into the game when defenceman Damir Ryspayev punched Kunlun forward Tomáš Marcinko in the face, then attacked three other Kunlun players before trying to jump into the Red Star bench. The attack appeared to be retaliation for a Kunlun hit in an earlier game that had left Barys forward Dustin Boyd with a broken leg. Officials cancelled the game, and Ryspayev was suspended and eventually given a lifetime ban from the KHL.

The Kunlun Red Star won its regular season KHL debut against Amur Khabarovsk by a score of 2–1. The first goal in franchise history was scored by Sean Collins at 14:00 of the first period. The team also won its second game, a home game in front of a crowd of 7,832 people, defeating Admiral Vladivostok by a final of 6–3.

On 27 October 2016, Chinese-Canadian defenceman Zach Yuen, a Vancouver-born draft pick of the Winnipeg Jets, became the first player of Chinese descent to score in a league game, in a 1–0 win over Khabarovsk. There were also four Chinese-born players on the team. KHL roster guidelines required that Red Star has any combination of at least 10 Russian and Chinese players.

After the team's first home game in Beijing, the team had to play its home games during the fall in Shanghai, as the arena in Beijing was not available. However, the interest in Shanghai for games was poor; average attendance was only 1,100 for the first 14 games in Shanghai. The team returned to Beijing in mid-December. After returning to Beijing, attendance improved and the team began attracting crowds of around 7,500, comparable with the more established KHL teams. Red Star finished the season with an average attendance of 2,952, the highest of any team in Asia. Games in Shanghai averaged 1,280, while their matches in Beijing saw an average of 5,137 spectators.

Kunlun Red Star qualified for the 2017 KHL postseason and faced the defending Gagarin Cup champions Metallurg Magnitogorsk in the conference quarterfinals.  Defenceman Tuukka Mäntylä scored the first two playoff goals in the Beijing club's history in a 4–2 loss to Metallurg.

2017-18 season 
On March 17, 2017 Mike Keenan was named head coach of the Chinese club. The team played very well to start to season, with a record of 6-3-1 through the first ten games but then dropped to 10-8-2 through the next ten games. Kunlun would then lose 17 out of 19 games until Keenan was relieved from his duties as head coach on December 3, 2017 before a game against Amur Khabarovsk. The team would rally and win that game 4-3 in overtime.

Keenan would be replaced by assistant coach Bobby Carpenter, who was given the title of interim head coach. The team played better under Carpenter than they had under Keenan as they finished 19-29-8. Carpenter finished with a record of 7-13-0 while Keenan had a record 12-16-8 record at the time of his dismissal as head coach. However, this improved play could not earn the team a spot in the KHL playoffs as Red Star would finish in last place in the Chernyshev Division and 23rd in the 27 team league that season.

The club's attendance suffered along with the on ice performance as they averaged 2501 spectators per game.

2018-19 season 
On February 23, 2018 Jussi Tapola was named head coach of Kunlun Red Star. The roster featured many newcomers but a core of key Chinese heritage players had carried over from the previous season. However, the new roster did not lead to improved on ice results as the team struggled to maintain an even win-loss record. After earning an 18-25-7 record, Tapola was relieved from his duties as head coach on January 18, 2019. Curt Frasier was named the new head coach.

The change in bench boss only worsened the club's play as the Dragons only won two of the remaining 12 regular season games. Kunlun would finish 20th out of 25 teams in the league with a record of 20-31-11, earning the Dragons 5th place in the Chernyshev Division.

But the season still featured some important milestones for hockey in China. On January 17, 2019, Sun Zehao became the first native born Chinese goalie to play in a KHL game. He came in relief of Tomi Karhunen in the 2nd period of a home game versus Yaroslavl Lokomotiv. Zehao stopped 13 of 15 shots but the Dragons would lose 5-1.

On February 20, 2019 in the second last game of the season, Ying Rudi would become the first native born Chinese player to score a KHL goal. The goal would come on home ice in Beijing against Red Star's divisional rival Admiral Vladivostok. Rudi's goal at 1:58 of the 3rd period would be the deciding goal in Kunlun's 6-3 victory.

Chinese heritage player Brandon Yip would set a club record by scoring 21 goals in the 2018-2019 campaign and Ville Lajunen set a club record for points by a defenseman with 28. Kunlun's attendance remained stable with 2507 average spectators.

2020–21 season 
On July 14, 2020, Kunlun Red Star notified the league that the club would base its operations in the Russian city of Mytishchi, outside of Moscow. The team would play out of Mytishchi Arena which seats 7,000 spectators for ice hockey. Due to bureaucratic complications caused by the COVID-19 pandemic, Kunlun was unable bring their import players to Russia for the start of the season. Red Star head coach Alexei Kovalev filled his ranks entirely with Russian players signed to try out contracts, until the foreign born players could join the team.

The team struggled to start the regular season, losing their first 7 games. The Dragons were awarded their first win of the season on September 22 when their opponent, Yaroslavl Lokomotiv, failed to arrive in Mytishchi for the game due to travel complications from the ongoing pandemic. The league also indicated that there were inconsistencies between the COVID-19 tests conducted by the team and the tests conducted by the league. Unfortunately for Kunlun, that victory did not immediately jump start the team as they would go on to lose the following 6 games.

The Dragons would earn their first on-ice victory of the season on October 15, 2020 when they defeated Ufa Salavat Yulaev by a score of 5-3 in Mytishchi. Kunlun battled back from a 2 goal deficit to tie the game early in the third period off of the stick of Danny Kristo. Then, with less than 10 minutes on the clock in the third period, captain Luke Lockhart beat Ufa goaltender Juha Metsola to give Kunlun the lead. Cory Kane's empty net goal in the final minute would seal the win for Kunlun.

With the foreign born core of the team in toe, the Dragons would win their next 2 games to complete their first 3 game win streak of the season.

On October 25, Red Star forward Alexei Toropchenko would set a club record for the fastest goal scored in a game. Toropchenko would score just 34 seconds into the game against CSKA Moscow.

On October 28, Kunlun would beat SKA St. Petersburg for the first time in club history by a score of 2-1. As a result of a COVID-19 outbreak in the St. Petersburg locker room, the powerhouse club's roster was greatly depleted. After trailing by a goal in the first period, Chinese-heritage player Tyler Wong would tie the game in the second period and Ryan Sproul would tally the game-winning goal less than 2 minutes later. Kunlun would lock the game down defensively and Red Star goaltender Simon Hrubec would help steal the game for the Dragons, allowing just 1 goal on 43 shots.

After their impressive win against St. Petersburg, the Dragons would go 0-7-2 over their next 9 games. Red Star would improve their play marginally in the middle of the season but would finish with an abysmal 2-17-1 record over the final 20 games of the season.  On February 3, 2021 Luke Lockhart would become the first Dragon to play 200 games for the club. Kunlun missed the playoffs for the 4th consecutive year ultimately finishing in last place in the Chernyshev division and 22nd in the league, just one rank above last place. Attendance suffered as a result of the club's relocation to Mytishchi with an average of just 709 spectators for the season.

2021-22 season 
On July 30, 2021 Ivano Zanatta was announced as the new head coach of Kunlun Red Star. Red Star General Manager Nikolai Feoktistov confirmed that the decision was made by the Chinese sporting authorities. The main objective for the club during the 2021-22 season was to prepare the Chinese national team for the 2022 Beijing Winter Olympics and Zanatta would coach the Olympic team as well. For this reason, Kunlun's roster was composed exclusively of players who were eligible to represent Team China in the Winter Olympics. This included numerous non-KHL regular players who had played for the organization at the Junior and VHL levels.

On September 4, forward Alex Riche scored his first career KHL goal after two seasons with Red Star where he only managed to play 4 games due to injury. His goal would complete an inspiring comeback against one of the league's top teams, Ak Bar Kazan, before Luke Lockhart broke the tie with less than ten minutes in regulation to secure the victory for the Dragons.

The club's poor performance in the 2021-22 season raised the ire of the IIHF ahead of the 2022 Winter Olympics in Beijing. But the federation ultimately decided to honor their 2018 decision to allow the host nation's team to compete. As the Olympic Games approached, Kunlun cut players from the roster who wouldn't make the cut for the national team. One of the cuts, Russian goaltender Alexander Lazushin, had played for Kunlun sporadically since the 2018-2019 season and was unable to secure Chinese citizenship because of the breaks in residency.

The Dragons would head into the Olympic break on a 14 game losing streak but the KHL never resumed play after the winter games and so the team would miss the post season for the fifth straight year. Kunlun finished dead last in the 24 team league with a franchise low in attendance with 409 average nightly spectators.

Season-by-season record

Note: GP = Games played, W = Wins, OTW = Overtime/shootout wins, OTL = Overtime/shootout losses, L = Losses, Pts = Points, GF = Goals for, GA = Goals against

Players

Current roster

See also
 KRS Vanke Rays – Women's team operated by Kunlun Red Star in the Women's Hockey League (ZhHL). The Kunlun Red Star name is still used for the team that competes in women's international play.
 KRS-BSU – an affiliate club playing in the Supreme Hockey League (VHL).

References

External links
 
  
  

 
Ice hockey teams in China
Kontinental Hockey League teams
Sport in Beijing
Ice hockey clubs established in 2016
2016 establishments in China
Chernyshev Division (KHL)